Funky 4 + 1 was an American hip hop group from The Bronx, New York, composed of 
Jazzy Jeff, Sharon Green, D.J. Breakout, Guy Williams, Keith Keith, The Voice of K.K. and Rodney Stone. The latter two members also performed together as the duo Double Trouble, notably in the film Wild Style. They were the first hip hop group to receive a record deal, as well as the first to perform live on national television. The group was also notable for being the first to have a woman MC, Sha-Rock.

History

"That's the Joint" was interpolated from Cheryl Lynn's "Got to Be Real". Music critic Robert Christgau of The Village Voice named it the best song of the 1980s. In his 1981 review of the single, Christgau gave it an A rating and wrote of its musical significance:The instrumental track, carried by Sugarhill bassist Doug Wimbish, is so compelling that for a while I listened to it alone on its B-side version. And the rapping is the peak of the form, not verbally—the debut has funnier words—but rhythmically. Quick tradeoffs and clamorous breaks vary the steady-flow rhyming of the individual MCs, and when it comes to Sha-Rock, Miss Plus One herself, who needs variation?" Funky 4 + 1 was the first hip hop group to appear on a national television show; on February 14 (Valentine's Day) 1981 they performed on Saturday Night Live hosted by Blondie's Deborah Harry.

The group was subsequently asked by Harry to open up for Blondie on tour, but were forbidden to do so by Sugarhill Records' CEO, Sylvia Robinson.

In 2008, its song "That's The Joint" was ranked number 41 on VH1's 100 Greatest Songs of Hip Hop.

Discography

Singles
"Rappin & Rocking The House" (1979)
 "That's The Joint" (1980)
 "Do You Want to Rock (Before I Let Go)" (1982)
 "Feel It" (The Mexican)" (1983)

Compilations
 Back To The Old School 2 – That's The Joint (1999)

Members
 The Voice of K.K. aka K.K. Rockwell (Kevin Smith) (1978–1981)
 Keith Keith (Keith Caesar) (1978–1983)
Sha Rock (Sharon Green) (1977–1983)
 Rahiem (Guy Todd Williams) (1977)
 Lil' Rodney C! (Rodney Stone) (1977–1981)
Jazzy Jeff (Jeff Miree) (1977–1983)
 D.J. Breakout (Keith Williams) (1977–1983)
 D.J. Baron (Baron Chappell) (1977–1980)
NOTE: Rahiem would later join Grandmaster Flash & the Furious Five, while Smith & Stone left in 1981 to form as a duo known as Double Trouble.

References

External links
 Jayquan profile
 Myspace
 The Career Cookbook Rahiem Profile
 Funky Four Plus One Discography at Discogs.com
 1981 Funky Four Plus One NME Interview

Hip hop groups from New York City
Musical groups established in 1977
Sugar Hill Records (hip hop label) artists